Rogue & Gambit is a five-issue comic book limited series published by Marvel Comics between January and May 2018. Created by writer Kelly Thompson and artist Pere Perez, it starred the popular X-Men characters Rogue and Gambit who reignite their relationship while investigating the disappearance of mutants at a vacation resort. The series received generally positive reviews from comic critics.

Publication history
Rogue and Gambit are one of the most popular couples in the X-Men franchise. Their relationship started in 1990, shortly after Gambit was introduced in comic books, and was a strong aspect of the X-Men TV series. Both characters come from the Southern United States and speak in over-the-top accents and slang.

The series was first announced in October 2017 at the New York Comic Con. Although both characters had previously been featured in self-titled comic series individually, this is the first miniseries starring them together. The five-issue limited series was written by Kelly Thompson with art by Pere Perez and covers by Kris Anka. Thompson considers herself a "little bit of an expert" on Rogue and Gambit and relied on editor Darren Shan to tell her when her writing was too steep in old continuity for newer readers to follow. Her primary influence for the series came from issues 4, 8, and 45 of the 1990s comic book X-Men showing failed dates between the characters.

The first issue was released on January 3, 2018. Comic shops ordered about 38,600 copies. By issue 3, orders had fallen to about 18,500. In a pre-release interview, Thompson hoped sales and fan response would be strong enough to warrant an ongoing series starring the characters. A softcover collection of the series is scheduled for release in June 2018 with the subtitle "Ring of Fire".

X-Men Gold #30, also by Thompson, was released some months later. It was advertised as a comic featuring the marriage of Kitty Pryde and Colossus, but it featured the marriage of Rogue and Gambit instead. This led to a new comic book starred by the duo, Mr. & Mrs. X.

Plot
When the X-Men suspect foul play at a vacation resort, former romantic partners Rogue and Gambit infiltrate the resort by pretending to be a couple needing marriage counseling. They discover the resort is managed by the villain Lavish, who is taking mutant visitors captive and replacing them with robot duplicates. Rogue and Gambit destroy all the robots and free the captive people. During this mission, Rogue and Gambit become a couple again.

Critical reception
The series received generally positive reviews, averaging 8.5 out of 10 according to review aggregator Comic Book Roundup. Thompson's dialogue was praised by Adventures in Poor Taste, who said she made the characters "more interesting than they've been in literal decades." In a review of the third issue, Comicosity found that while the story is accessible to new readers, it is unlikely to create an emotional connection to the characters. Pérez was complimented by Bam Smack Pow on his double splash pages and by Newsarama for his costume choices, but CBR found some of his characters to be stiff and sexless. This opinion is in contrast with Thompson, who said she was "surprised" by how sexy the artwork was.

References

X-Men titles